The discography of Jaya, a Filipina singer, consists of twelve studio albums, thirty singles, and one live album as of 2019. Jaya is known in the Philippines as the Queen of Soul. Born Maria Luisa Ramsey on March 21, 1970 in Manila, Philippines, the name Jaya came from her record label LMR Records when they signed her as their recording artist in 1989.

Her biggest break in the Philippine music scene came when she won first place in the 1996 Metropop Song Festival for her interpretation of "Sometimes You Just Know" by Edith Gallardo and Danny Tan. She also won Best Interpreter at the Asia Song Festival held in Hong Kong in February 1997 for her rendition of the song "You Lift Me Up", composed by Danny Tan with lyrics by Dodjie Simon. This composition also won grand prize, the Best Song award. She sold total of 1 million records worldwide.

Albums

Studio albums

Compilation albums

Live albums

Singles 
 The following songs were released in the Philippines as promotional singles for radio and television, as physical singles have never been released there (only albums). An asterisk indicates that the single was released both in the country and in US and Japan.

See also 
 List of best-selling albums in the Philippines

References

Discographies of Filipino artists
Pop music discographies
Contemporary R&B discographies